Lord Otho Augustus FitzGerald PC (10 October 1827 – 19 November 1882) was a British soldier and Liberal politician. He notably served as Comptroller of the Household under William Gladstone between 1868 and 1874. He was also a noted amateur composer.

Background
Although the family home of the Duke of Leinster was Carton House near Maynooth, County Kildare (Ireland), FitzGerald was born at Harrington House, Northamptonshire (England), the home of his mother. He was the third son of Augustus FitzGerald, 3rd Duke of Leinster, by his wife Lady Charlotte Augusta Stanhope, daughter of General Charles Stanhope, 3rd Earl of Harrington. Charles FitzGerald, 4th Duke of Leinster, was his elder brother. Another brother, Gerald Fitzgerald (1821–1886) was, like Otho, an amateur composer and a noted artist.

Political career
Fitzgerald was an officer in the Royal Horse Guards and served as a Gentleman of the Bedchamber to the Lord-Lieutenant of Ireland. He entered the House of Commons in 1865 as member for Kildare, a seat he held until 1874. In 1866 he was sworn of the Privy Council and made Treasurer of the Household under Lord Russell, a post he only held until the fall of the Liberal government in June of that year. He returned to office as Comptroller of the Household under William Gladstone in 1868, a post he retained until the government fell in 1874.

Fitzgerald died at Bray, Berkshire.

Family
Lord Otho married Ursula Lucy Grace Bridgeman, daughter of Vice Admiral Charles Orlando Bridgeman and widow of Lord Londesborough, on 14 December 1861. This was regarded by his contemporaries as a fortune-hunting match. They had two children:

Major Gerald Otho FitzGerald (25 September 1862 – 20 March 1919), unmarried and without issue.
Ina Blanche Georgie FitzGerald (12 January 1864 – 6 July 1910), married on 29 January 1885 Major Arthur Leopold Paget (19 August 1856 – 1 March 1906).

Fitzgerald for a while owned Oakley Court on the Thames, at Bray in Berkshire. He died in November 1882, aged 55. Lady Otho FitzGerald only survived him by a year and died in November 1883. They are buried at St Andrew's Church, Clewer.

Musical compositions
Fitzgerald probably enjoyed a private musical education. He published piano music in Dublin with Robinson & Bussell (later Henry Bussel). Works include:
The Spirit of the Ball (c.1850)
The Irish Steeple Chase Galop (c.1860)
The Mirage Valses (c.1860)
The Mistletoe Waltzes (not dated)
The Staff Polka (not dated)
The composer Oscar Krahmer dedicated his piano work The Garrison Ball Galop (1857) to Otho Fitzgerald.

References

External links
 

1827 births
1882 deaths
19th-century classical composers
Composers for piano
Otho
Irish classical composers
Members of the Parliament of the United Kingdom for County Kildare constituencies (1801–1922)
Members of the Privy Council of the United Kingdom
People from Bray, Berkshire
Treasurers of the Household
UK MPs 1865–1868
UK MPs 1868–1874
Younger sons of dukes